Cameron Jette (born July 1, 1987) is a Canadian male cyclo-cross cyclist. He represented his nation in the men's elite event at the 2016 UCI Cyclo-cross World Championships in Heusden-Zolder.
After a 2 year absence Cameron returned to competition at the 2019 World Cyclocross Championships in Bogense, Denmark. Three laps into the race he was involved in a crash with Slovakia's Ondrej Glaza. He finished the race in 56th place. Cameron also won a euchre tournament while paired with Gunnar Holmgren. They defeated Tyler Orschel and Magdaleine Vallieres Mill rather easily in a best of 7.

References

External links
 Profile at cyclingarchives.com

1987 births
Living people
Cyclo-cross cyclists
Canadian male cyclists
Sportspeople from Toronto
21st-century Canadian people